Muppala Lakshmana Rao, commonly known by his nom de guerre Ganapathy or Ganapathi, is the leader of the Indian Maoist movement and former General Secretary of the Communist Party of India (Maoist), a banned Maoist insurgent communist party in India. He resigned from the post in November 2018.

Early life
Ganapathy was born in Sarangapur, Karimnagar district of Telangana. He is a science graduate and also holds a B.Ed. degree. He worked as a teacher in Karimnagar district but deserted his job to pursue higher education in Warangal.

Early political life
In Warangal, Ganapathy came in touch with the Maoist cadres Nalla Adi Reddy and Kondapalli Seetharamaiah, and eventually he also decided to join the Naxalite movement in the country. He was one of the early members of Communist Party of India (Marxist-Leninist) People's War (People's War Group) and grew as General Secretary of the party that is now called as Communist Party of India (Maoist), an output of the merger of People's War Group and Maoist Communist Centre of India (MCCI) that took place in 2004. He remains active in the so-called red belt of India including the Bastar region of Chhattisgarh.

Other than Ganapathy he is known by several other aliases viz Mupalla Lakshman Rao, Shrinivas, Rajanna, Raji Reddy, Radhakrishna, GP, Chandrasekhar, Azith and CS.

Personal life
Ganapathy tends to be reclusive and difficult to meet, and has only done a few interviews. This includes an in-depth interview with  Chindu Sreedharan of rediff.com in 1998, with the BBC, and with Rahul Pandita, a journalist from Open magazine and the author of "Hello Bastar" and with Shubhranshu Choudhary a former BBC journalist and writer of "Let's call him Vasu: With Maoists in Chhattisgarh".

Role in Maoist activities
Ganapathy is one of the most wanted persons by the Indian security forces for his role in several Naxal activities. National Investigation Agency has announced an award of  1,500,000 for any information leading to his arrest. The total bounty on his head is the highest currently in India, which is  36,000,000. He has been replaced by his second-in-command Nambala Keshava Rao alias Basavaraj in November 2018 due to ill health. Ganapathy has been replaced his position as Maoist general secretary and was suspected to have fled to the Philippines through Nepal.

References

External links
 International Campaign Against War on the People in India
 Interview with Comrade Ganapathy, General Secretary (GS), CPI (Maoist) given to Swedish writer Jan Myrdal and Gautam Navlakha

Anti-revisionists
Communist Party of India (Maoist) politicians
Indian guerrillas
Indian Marxists
Naxalite–Maoist insurgency
Living people
1949 births
People from Karimnagar district
Maoist theorists